Series 21 of Top Gear, a British motoring magazine and factual television programme, was broadcast in the United Kingdom on BBC Two during 2014, consisting of five episodes between 2 February and 2 March; production on the series was confirmed via Twitter in 2013, with a teaser trailer released on the BBC's YouTube channel in January 2014. This series' highlights included the presenters looking back at hatchbacks that were available during their youth, a look at the British military vehicles used in Afghanistan, and a road trip across Ukraine that included a visit to Chernobyl.

The series was followed by a two-part series filmed in Myanmar and focusing on the presenters travelling the across the country in lorries, which was titled "Burma Special", and aired on 9–16 March 2014. The special's second part drew criticism of racism over a comment made by Jeremy Clarkson, which raised questions on his future with the BBC because of the controversies he was creating.

Production
Confirmation that filming of Series 21 was made on 16 September 2013 via a tweet made on Jeremy Clarkson's Twitter account, which confirmed the two part special was being filmed on 20 October later that year. A teaser trailer for the new series was released on the BBC's YouTube channel, and across BBC channels on 17 January 2014.

Episodes

Criticism
In the second part of the Burma Special, a scene showing the presenters looking over their completed bridge over the Kok River, featured a moment in which a native of the area is crossing the bridge as Jeremy Clarkson says to Richard Hammond about their finished work - "That is a proud moment, but there's a slope on it." Following the broadcast of the second part, complaints of racism arose in regard to the comment, primarily citing that "slope" was a derogatory term for an Asian, leading to Top Gear and Andy Wilman, the show's executive producer, apologising for any offence caused by it in late April 2014, while subsequently cutting the scene from future repeats of the special. In a statement by Wilman to the media, the executive producer said:

"When we used the word slope in the recent Top Gear Burma Special it was a light-hearted word play joke referencing both the build quality of the bridge and the local Asian man who was crossing it. We were not aware at the time, and it has subsequently been brought to our attention, that the word slope is considered by some to be offensive and although it might not be widely recognised in the UK, we appreciate that it can be considered offensive to some here and overseas, for example in Australia and the USA. If we had known that at the time we would not have broadcast the word in this context and regret any offence caused."

However, a few months later, British broadcasting regulator Ofcom, which investigated the complaints of racism in regard to the comment, ruled that both the BBC and Top Gear had breached broadcasting rules for using offensive language, stating that the use of the term was both offensive and racist, that the explanation of its context for the broadcast could not be justified, and that the broadcaster had missed opportunities during filming and post-production to "check whether the word had the potential to offend viewers". Following the incident, and emergence of video evidence of an unaired take during filming for Series 19, in which he was shown to mumble another racist term, the BBC chose to give Jeremy Clarkson a final warning in regard to his behaviour, amidst calls by many public figures for him to be fired.

References

2014 British television seasons
Top Gear seasons